I Shardana is a 1949 opera by Sardinian composer Ennio Porrino which was premiered in 1959 at the Teatro San Carlo, Naples under Gastone Limarilli and Piero Guelfi. The libretto by the composer was inspired by Bronze Age stone towers, megalithic nuraghes, found across Sardinia.

Recording

DVD Button Marrocu, Palomba, Ledda; Signorini, Villari, Ruggeri, Balzani, Mangione; Orchestra and Chorus of Fondazione Teatro Lirico di Cagliari, Bramall. Production: Livermore. Dynamic 37683, 114 mins., subtitled

References

Operas
1959 operas
Italian-language operas